Hygrophila difformis, commonly known as water wisteria (though it is not closely related to true wisteria), is an aquatic plant in the acanthus family. It is found in marshy habitats on the Indian subcontinent in Bangladesh, Bhutan, India and Nepal. It grows to a height of 20 to 50 cm with a width of 15 to 25 cm.

Cultivation
Water wisteria is easy to grow and as such it is a very popular plant for the tropical aquarium. It grows best in good light with a nutrient rich water and substrate and it benefits from additional CO2. It can be easily propagated from cuttings.

Heterophylly
Hygrophila difformis shows heterophyly which is the occurrence of different leaf morphology in the same plant.

References

External links

difformis
Flora of Asia
Aquatic plants